Julia Batino (Monastir, 1914 – Jasenovac, 1942) was a Macedonian Jewish antifascist and women's rights activist. She was made President of the Bitola WIZO (Croatian ZICO Ženska Internacionalna Cionisticka Organizacija Women's International Zionist Organization) in 1934, an organization which was actively involved in the progressive women's movement in Yugoslavia. 

Batino directed her energies towards the emancipation of Jewish women, particularly young women. 

Batino's connections to the Jewish community in Belgrade enabled her to send a certain number of Jewish girls from Bitola to work or study in Belgrade each year, among them Haim Estreya Ovadya, among the first women to join the Partisans in 1941.

See also
 History of the Jews in North Macedonia
 History of the Jews in Monastir

References

1914 births
1942 deaths
People from Bitola
Jewish feminists
Jewish anti-fascists
People who died in Jasenovac concentration camp
Macedonian Jews who died in the Holocaust
Yugoslav Partisans members
Women in the Yugoslav Partisans
Jews in the Yugoslav Partisans
European Zionists
Jewish women activists